Shamsul Haque Talukder is a Jatiya Party (Ershad) politician and the former Member of Parliament of Tangail-2.

Career
Talukder was elected to parliament from Tangail-2 as a Jatiya Party candidate in 1986. He was elected Bhuapur Upazila Parishad Chairman. He was removed from his post by the government for alleged corruption.

References

Jatiya Party politicians
Living people
3rd Jatiya Sangsad members
Year of birth missing (living people)